The North River is a river, approximately 6 miles (9.6 km) long, in northeastern Minnesota, the United States.  Along with the East River, it is one of the primary tributaries of Seven Beaver Lake, the source of the Saint Louis River.  Most of the North River lies in Lake County, with its outlet located in St. Louis County.  The United States Geological Survey considers North River to be the source stream (most distant headwaters) of the entire drainage basin of the Great Lakes and St. Lawrence system.

See also
 Minnesota rivers

References

Rivers of Minnesota
Rivers of Lake County, Minnesota
Rivers of St. Louis County, Minnesota